The prix Wepler is a French literary award established in 1998 at the initiative of the Abbesses Bookshop, with the support of the La Poste Foundation, and the Brasserie Wepler (Place Clichy, 18th arrondissement of Paris) and which distinguishes, in the month of November, a contemporary author. It works with a rotating jury system.

Laureates

Prix Wepler 
 1998: Florence Delaporte, Je n'ai pas de château
 1999: Antoine Volodine, Des anges mineurs
 2000: Laurent Mauvignier, Apprendre à finir
 2001: Yves Pagès, Le Théoriste 
 2002: Marcel Moreau, Corpus Scripti
 2003: Éric Chevillard, Le Vaillant Petit Tailleur
 2004: François Bon, Daewoo  
 2005: Richard Morgiève, Vertig
 2006: Pavel Hak, Trans
 2007: Olivia Rosenthal, On n'est pas là pour disparaître
 2008: Emmanuelle Pagano, 
 2009: Lyonel Trouillot, Yanvalou pour Charlie
 2010: Linda Lê, Cronos
 2011: Éric Laurrent, Les Découvertes
 2012: Leslie Kaplan, Millefeuille
 2013: , Sur la Scène intérieure. Faits
 2014: Jean-Hubert Gailliot, 
 2015: Pierre Senges, Achab (séquelles)
 2016: Stéphane Audeguy, Histoire du lion Personne

Special mention 
The special mention of the Wepler-Fondation La Poste Prize rewards a work marked by an audacity, an excess, a singularity escaping any commercial purpose.
 1999: Vincent de Swarte, Requiem pour un sauvage, Jean-Jacques Pauvert
 2000: Richard Morgiève, Ma vie folle, Pauvert
 2001: Brigitte Giraud, À présent, Stock
 2002: Thierry Beinstingel, Composants, Fayard
 2003: Alain Satgé, Tu n'écriras point, Éditions du Seuil
 2004: Jean-Louis Magnan, Anti-Liban, Verticales
 2005: Zahia Rahmani, « Musulman » Roman, Sabine Wespieser
 2006: Héléna Marienské,  Rhésus, 
 2007: Louise Desbrusses, Couronnes boucliers armures, POL 
 2008: Céline Minard, Bastard Battle, 
 2009: Hélène Frappat, Par effraction, Allia
 2010: Jacques Abeille, for lifetime achievement
 2011: François Dominique, Solène, 
 2012: Jakuta Alikavazovic, La Blonde et le Bunker, Éditions de l'Olivier
 2013: Philippe Rahmy, Béton armé, La Table ronde
 2014: Sophie Divry, La Condition pavillonnaire, Noir sur Blanc
 2015: Lise Charles, Comme Ulysse, POL
 2016: Ali Zamir, Anguille sous roche, Le Tripode

References

External links 
 Prix Wepler sur le blog officiel de la librairie des Abbesses, organisatrice du prix Wepler
 Le Prix Wepler - Fondation La Poste on Wepler
  Prix Wepler on LivresHebdos

Wepler
Awards established in 1998
1998 establishments in France